Richfield is a city in and the county seat of Sevier County, Utah, United States, and is the largest city in southern-central Utah.

Description

As of the 2010 census, the city population was 7,551. The county can be best described as "rural diversified" due to the convergence of agricultural, retail and industrial activities. Richfield has developed as a regional tourist center because it is located on the interstate freeway about halfway between Los Angeles, California and Denver, Colorado, attracting many automobile travelers who stop at the city.

Some examples are Sigurd, Venice, Glenwood, and Central Valley. Its remoteness, plus its location on major transportation corridors, makes it central Utah's de facto regional capital, a shopping and "commercial capital of a vast mountain-valley region." Many people from the region drive to Richfield to shop, bowl, golf, to attend theater, concerts, or for religious gatherings. They are also drawn to the community college, affiliated with Snow College, and go there to receive medical care. Richfield is part of "Panoramaland;" it is on the thoroughfare to several nearby national parks and national forests.

History
Prehistoric people occupied the Richfield area for more than 7,000 years. Fremont culture remains are found near most community sites in the Sevier area. They are dated from approximately CE 1 to CE 1000. In the late summer of 1776, Father Escalante and his party of Spanish explorers passed through the general vicinity, looking for a trail to link Nuevo Mexico and California. During the late 1820s, Jedediah Smith and other fur traders crossed the area. Sevier County lay on one of the variants on the Old Spanish Trail between Santa Fe, New Mexico, and California and was used by travelers between 1830 and 1850.

In early January 1864, a party of ten men under the leadership of Albert Lewis came from Sanpete County, Utah, and arrived in what is now Richfield. The Mormon settlers found fertile soil, good water, and wood in the nearby hills. They decided that it was a desirable site for a settlement. These pioneers made a dwelling place for all ten men, which they called 'The Hole in the Ground.' They carefully covered this hole with brush willows and other materials and made a crude chimney of rocks. This dugout was located on today's Main Street. These men spent the remainder of the winter in this dwelling, planning and preparing for when they could bring their families.

The early Mormon settlements were abandoned in 1867 due to the conflict known as the Black Hawk War. But, when resettled in 1871, Richfield grew to become a regional center. The coming of the Denver and Rio Grande Railroad in 1891 opened the valley for expanded agricultural commerce and mining.

In 1939, Utah Governor Henry H. Blood vetoed a proposal for a junior college in Richfield. Fifty-seven years later, Snow College opened a Richfield campus, which serves about 600 students annually.

Religion
As in most settled areas of rural Utah, The Church of Jesus Christ of Latter-day Saints (LDS Church) plays a prominent role. The Mormons were highly industrious settlers. From 1847, when they founded Salt Lake City, until 1877, they founded 360 towns. Following direction from Brigham Young, Latter-day Saints founded the town and outlying hamlets about 150 years ago. Members of the LDS Church are predominant among the residents.

Even in this heart of Mormon country, non-Mormons and non-participating Mormons, the latter euphemistically called "less-actives," fill a percentage of elected offices. Due largely to combined influences of conservative rural culture and the Latter-day Saints, the voters of the city and the surrounding county are predominately Republican.

The Richfield area has 20 major denominational churches including The Church of Jesus Christ of Latter-day Saints, St. Elizabeth Catholic Church, First Baptist Church, Sister of Holy Cross, Jehovah's Witnesses, Good Shepherd Lutheran Church, Assembly of God, and others.

Geography and climate

Richfield is served by major transportation access – situated along Interstate 70 and within 30 minutes of Interstate 15.

Richfield experiences a cold semi-arid climate (Köppen BSk) with four distinct seasons. Winter high temperatures average in the 30s and 40s with many milder days; low temperatures average in the teens and twenties, with a few mornings starting near or below zero. Snowfall is common, but usually melts in a day or two; however, deeper lasting snow cover is not uncommon. Still, December and January average among Richfield’s drier months. Summer days are warm, with normal July highs in the 90s and occasional hot spells that near . Nighttime temperatures during the summer are comfortable—usually in the 50s or 60s. Because of its low humidity and mile-high altitude, the Sevier Valley experiences its average first frost by late September and its last in late May, despite the typically warm fall and spring days.

There are an average of 64 days with measurable precipitation.

Demographics

As of the census of 2010, there were 7,551 people living in the city. The population density was 1,424.7 people per square mile (551.2/km2). There were 2,792 housing units at an average density of 526.79 per square mile (200.9/km2). The racial makeup of the city was 94.41% White, 0.39% African American, 3.29% Native American, 0.26% Asian, 0.07% Pacific Islander, 0.55% from other races, and 1.02% from two or more races. Hispanic or Latino of any race were 2.35% of the population.

In 2000, there were 2,166 households, out of which 44.0% had children under the age of 18 living with them, 66.2% were married couples living together, 8.9% had a female householder with no husband present, and 22.3% were non-families. 20.4% of all households were made up of individuals, and 11.3% had someone living alone who was 65 years of age or older. The average household size was 2.97 and the average family size was 3.45.

In the city, the population was spread out, with 35.4% under the age of 18, 10.8% from 18 to 24, 22.7% from 25 to 44, 17.0% from 45 to 64, and 14.1% who were 65 years of age or older. The median age was 29 years. For every 100 females, there were 97.1 males. For every 100 females age 18 and over, there were 94.1 males.

The median income for a household in the city was $36,024, and the median income for a family was $40,284. Males had a median income of $33,000 versus $20,489 for females. The per capita income for the city was $14,320. About 7.0% of families and 9.3% of the population were below the poverty line, including 10.5% of those under age 18 and 9.4% of those age 65 or over.

The city has seen an increase in population in every decennial census since 1940, at which time it was reported to have 3,584 people living in the city.

Economy
Major employers in Richfield include Walmart, Sevier Valley Hospital, Lin's Fresh Market, and forest headquarters for Fishlake National Forest. There are also several smaller employers, such as restaurants, hotels, and local businesses.

The local weekly newspaper is The Richfield Reaper.

Transportation

Interstate 70/U.S. Route 89 is the main highway serving Richfield. Utah State Route 118 runs to Joseph. Utah State Route 119 runs to Glenwood. Utah State Route 120 serves as a business loop through Richfield.

Richfield is served by Greyhound to Denver and Las Vegas, Nevada.

Richfield Municipal Airport is located one mile southwest of the city.

Education
Richfield is located in the Sevier School District. There are two elementary schools (Ashman and Pahvant), one middle school (Red Hills), one high school (Richfield), and one alternative high school (Cedar Ridge). There is also a satellite campus of Snow College.

Notable people

 Edward O. Anderson, architect for the LDS Church - born in Richfield
 Theodore Brandley, former Mayor of Richfield and a Mormon missionary and colonizer of Stirling, Alberta, Canada.
 Jake Garn, served as a U.S. Senator representing Utah; the first member of the United States Congress to fly in space – born in Richfield
 Joseph Hansen, secretary and guard to Leon Trotsky in Mexico for the last three years before Trotsky was murdered – born in Richfield
 Walter Frederick Morrison, the inventor of the Frisbee
 Howard C. Nielson, member of the U.S. House of Representatives and both houses of the Utah State Legislature – born in Richfield
 Cornelius Salisbury, painter
 Mary Thurman, silent film star

See also

 Clear Creek (Utah)
 Fishlake National Forest
 Fish Lake, Utah
 Fremont Indian State Park
 Glenwood, Utah
 Intermountain Health Care
 KUES, PBS station, local channel 19 (a full power relay station of KUED, carrying a remodulated analog signal) KUED 7: Annual Report
 List of Registered Historic Places in Utah:Sevier County
 Medina, Washington
 Sevier River
 Survivalism
 The Richfield Reaper — local newspaper
 Reel Theatres

References

External links

 Official city website
 Website for Snow College Richfield Campus

Cities in Utah
County seats in Utah
Cities in Sevier County, Utah
Populated places established in 1864